Time is the debut studio album by American recording artist Mikky Ekko. The album was released worldwide on January 16, 2015, by RCA Records, except for the United States where it was released on January 20.

Background
Mikky Ekko rose to fame with his 2013 Rihanna collaboration "Stay". Following the release of "Stay", RCA Records wanted to capitalize on its success, said Mikky Ekko: "From the label, people on Rihanna's side. I think we speculated a little bit about going out on the tour with Rih, and I ultimately felt like the songs weren't there. And I said I'm not gonna go out to promote an album that could be better. And I know the sort of the endless tweaking that can happen, but I feel like we took the time to put together a really, really strong album full of songs that at least for me represents exactly where I am."

Critical reception
At Metacritic, which assigns a weighted average score out of 100 to reviews from mainstream critics, Time received an average score of 59% based on 5 reviews, indicating "mixed or average reviews".

Track listing

Notes
 signifies an additional producer
 signifies a co-producer
 signifies a bonus track on certain editions

Personnel
Musicians
 Mikky Ekko – vocals (all tracks), strings (7)
 Greg Kurstin – guitar, keyboards, programming (2)
 Elof Loelv – programming (2)
 Ryan Tedder – background vocals, piano (3)
 Noel Zancanella – programming (3)
 Jason Lehning – bass (5)
 Claire Indie Nunn – cello (5)
 Rayland Baxter – guitar (5)
 Fraser T. Smith – strings (5)
 Eleondore Denig – violin (5)
 Davey Faragher – bass (6)
 Josh Freese – drums (6)
 Jake Orrall – guitar (6)
 Doug Showalter – acoustic guitar (8)
 Jeff Bhasker – guitar, keyboards (8)
 Trinity Seenath – shaker (8)
 John Paul Roney – guitar (10)
 Eric Hillman – guitar (12)

Technical

 Chris Athens – mastering
 Mark Stent – mixing (1, 3, 5, 7, 9, 11, 12)
 Tom Elmhirst – mixing (2, 6, 10)
 Blood Diamonds – mixing, engineering (4)
 Jon Castelli – mixing (8)
 Elof Loelv – engineering (2, 7)
 Noel Zancanella – engineering (3, 11)
 Ryan Tedder – engineering (3, 11)
 Eric Masse – engineering, recording (5)
 Alex Salibian – engineering (8)
 Tyler Sam Johnson – engineering (8)
 Dave Way – engineering (6)
 Dennis Herring – engineering (6)
 Zeph Sowers – engineering (6)
 Chris Sclafani – engineering (9)
 Clams Casino – engineering (9), recording (10)
 Justin Parker – engineering (9)
 Nick Ruth – engineering (11)
 Graham Archer – recording (5)
 Mikky Ekko – recording (10)
 Geoff Swan – engineering assistance (1, 3, 5, 7, 9, 11)
 Matty Green – engineering assistance (1, 3, 5, 7, 9, 11)
 Ben Baptie – engineering assistance (2, 6, 10)
 Joe Visciano – engineering assistance (2, 6, 10)
 Ryan Nasci – engineering assistance (8)

Artwork
 Erwin Gorostiza – creative direction
 Alexis Copeland – design
 Gareth Fewel – design
 Jason White – design
 Leviathan – design
 Eliot Lee Hazel – photography

Charts

References

External links
 

2015 debut albums
RCA Records albums
Albums produced by Benny Blanco
Albums produced by Stargate
Albums produced by Ryan Tedder
Albums produced by Fraser T. Smith
Albums produced by Dave Sitek
Albums produced by Jeff Bhasker